The World Uranium Hearing was held in Salzburg, Austria in September 1992. Anti-nuclear speakers from all continents, including indigenous speakers and scientists, testified to the health and environmental problems of uranium mining and processing, nuclear power, nuclear weapons, nuclear tests, and radioactive waste disposal.

People who spoke at the 1992 Hearing include: Thomas Banyacya, Katsumi Furitsu, Manuel Pino and Floyd Red Crow Westerman. They said they were deeply dismayed by the atomic bombings of Hiroshima and Nagasaki and highlighted what they called the inherently destructive nature of all phases of the nuclear supply chain. They recalled the disastrous impact of nuclear weapons testing in places such as the Nevada Test Site, Bikini Atoll and Eniwetok, Tahiti, Maralinga, and Central Asia. They highlighted the threat of radioactive contamination to all peoples, especially indigenous communities and said that their survival requires self-determination and emphasis on spiritual and cultural values. Increased renewable energy commercialization was advocated.

See also
International Uranium Film Festival
Uranium in the environment
History of the anti-nuclear movement
The Navajo People and Uranium Mining
Uranium mining debate
List of Nuclear-Free Future Award recipients
Hibakusha

References

Nuclear technology
Radiobiology
Radioactivity
Uranium politics
Anti-nuclear movement
1992 in Austria
September 1992 events in Europe
1992 in science